An Asclepiad (Latin: Asclepiadeus) is a line of poetry following a particular metrical pattern. The form is attributed to Asclepiades of Samos and is one of the Aeolic metres.

As with other Aeolic metrical lines, the asclepiad is built around a choriamb.  The Asclepiad may be described as a glyconic that has been expanded with one (Lesser Asclepiad) or two (Greater Asclepiad) further choriambs.  The pattern (using "-" for a long syllable, "u" for a short and "x" for an "anceps" or free syllable, which can be either - or u) is:

 x x  - u u -  - u u -  u - (Lesser Asclepiad / Asclepiadeus minor)
 x x  - u u -  - u u -  - u u -  u - (Greater Asclepiad / Asclepiadeus maior)

West (1982) designates the Asclepiad as a "choriambically expanded glyconic" with the notation glc (lesser) or gl2c (greater).

Asclepiads were used in Latin by Horace in thirty-four of his odes, as well as by Catullus in Poem 30, and Seneca in six tragedies. Examples in English verse include poems by Sir Philip Sidney, and W. H. Auden's "In Due Season" ("Springtime, Summer and Fall: days to behold a world"). Lines from Sidney's Arcadia:

References

 Printed sources

Types of verses
Ancient Greek poetry